The Pecos springsnail, scientific name Pyrgulopsis pecosensis, is a species of gastropod in the family Hydrobiidae, the mud snails. It is endemic to the United States.

References

Endemic fauna of the United States
Pyrgulopsis
Gastropods described in 1987
Taxonomy articles created by Polbot